Dmitri Konstantinovich of Suzdal (1323–1383) was a powerful Prince of Suzdal and Nizhny Novgorod who dominated Russian politics during the minority of his son-in-law, Dmitri Donskoi. The famous Shuisky family descends from his eldest son, Vasily Kirdyapa.

A senior descendant of Vsevolod the Big Nest and also of Yaroslav II of Vladimir (Dmitry was great-grandson of Yaroslav II's third son Andrey), he inherited Suzdal in 1359 and Nizhny Novgorod in 1365. His policy towards Tatars was conciliatory for the most part, as his eastern lands were continuously exposed to their attacks. After some rivalry with Dmitri of Moscow, he was installed by the Khan of the Golden Horde as the Grand Duke of Vladimir in 1360. During his reign, he repeatedly quarreled with the Novgorod Republic over the raids of Novgorodian pirates who looted his own capital and Tatar markets along the Volga River.

Three years later he was dethroned and had to make peace with Dmitri by marrying him to his daughter, Eudoxia. Joining his army with Dmitri's, he led an allied assault on Volga Bulgars and Mordovia. In 1377, the allied armies were defeated by the Tatars on the Pyana River, because (as the chronicler put it) they were too drunk to fight. However, in 1382 Dmitry Konstantinovich took the side of Khan Tokhtamysh in taking over Moscow and sent his sons to serve in the Tatar army.

Family
He had issue:
 Vasiliy Kirdyapa c. 1350-1403, prince of Suzdal. A descendant of 6th generation is Vasili IV tsar of Russia.
 Simeon died 1402, prince of Suzdal. A descendant of 8th generation is Michael I Romanov tsar of Russia.
 Eudoxia died 1407, married to Dmitry Donskoy grand prince of Moscow.

References

1324 births
1383 deaths
14th-century Russian people
14th-century Russian princes
Shuysky family
Grand Princes of Vladimir
Eastern Orthodox monarchs
Rurik dynasty